San Carlos is the capital city of the municipality of San Carlos and of the Río San Juan Department of Nicaragua.

The city proper has a population of roughly 17,000, while the city and surrounding communities (Comarcas) contain a population of 51,915
(2021 estimate). San Carlos is positioned on the confluence of Lake Nicaragua and the San Juan River. The Solentiname Islands in Lake Nicaragua are part of the Municipality of San Carlos.

Comarcas 
The municipality is divided into the following comarcas:

International relations

Twin towns – Sister cities
San Carlos is twinned with:

External links

Site of the Groningen - San Carlos foundation (Dutch)

References 

Municipalities of the Río San Juan Department